The 2015 NCAA Division I Tennis Championships were the men's and women's tennis tournaments played concurrently from May 14 to May 25, 2015 in Waco, Texas on the campus of Baylor University. It was the 70th edition of the NCAA Division I Men's Tennis Championship* and the 34th edition of the NCAA Division I Women's Tennis Championship*, and the tenth time that the men's and women's tournaments were held at the same venue. It consisted of a men's and women's team, singles, and doubles championships.

The No. 3 seeded Virginia Cavaliers defeated the home-team No. 2 Baylor Bears, 4–2, and then the No. 1 seeded Oklahoma Sooners, 4–1, to take the men's title. This led the Cavaliers to win the Capital One Cup for overall men's sports after Virginia also won the 2014 College Cup in soccer and 2015 College World Series in baseball during the same academic year.

Men's team championship
Note: Matches from the First Round and Second Round were held at the home courts of the national seeds with the winning team advancing to the championship rounds in Waco, Texas. Bold indicates that a team is still active.

National seeds

1.  Oklahoma (Championship Round)
2.   Baylor  (semifinals)
3.   Virginia (National Champions)
4.   Illinois (third round)
5.  TCU  (semifinals)
6.  Texas A&M  (quarterfinals) 
7.  USC  (quarterfinals) 
8.  Georgia (quarterfinals)
9.  Texas (third round) 
10.  Duke (third round) 
11.  Ohio State (third round) 
12.  Wake Forest (third round) 
13.  North Carolina (quarterfinals) 
14.  Ole Miss (second round) 
15.  Virginia Tech (second round) 
16.  UCLA (third round)

Finals bracket

 Virginia player Mitchell Frank was named the most valuable player

Women's team championship
Note: Matches from the First Round and Second Round were held at the home courts of the national seeds with the winning team advancing to the championship rounds in Waco, Texas. Bold indicates that a team is still active.

National seeds

1. USC (semifinals) 
2. North Carolina (quarterfinals) 
3. California (third round) 
4. Vanderbilt (National Champions)

5. Florida (quarterfinals) 
6. Georgia (semifinals) 
7. UCLA (Runner-up) 
8. Baylor (quarterfinals)

9. Virginia (third round) 
10. Texas A&M (third round) 
11. Michigan (third round) 
12. Oklahoma State (third round) 

13. Alabama (second round) 
14. Stanford (quarterfinals) 
15. Miami (FL) (third round) 
16. Texas Tech (third round)

Finals bracket

All-tournament team
No. 1 Doubles: Lauren Herring/Ellen Perez (Georgia)
No. 2 Doubles: Catherine Harrison/Kyle McPhillips (UCLA)
No. 3 Doubles: Marie Casares/Frances Altick (Vanderbilt)
No. 1 Singles: Robin Anderson (UCLA)
No. 2 Singles: Astra Sharma (Vanderbilt)
No. 3 Singles: Jennifer Brady (UCLA)
No. 4 Singles: Courtney Colton (Vanderbilt)
No. 5 Singles: Hannah King (Georgia)
No. 6 Singles: Ashleigh Antal (Vanderbilt)
Most Outstanding Player: Astra Sharma (Vanderbilt)

Men's singles championship
Note: Matches from all six rounds were played in Waco, Texas from May 20–25, 2015.

National seeds

  Axel Alvarez Llamas, Oklahoma (Round of 32)
  Julian Lenz, Baylor (Round of 32)
  Mackenzie McDonald, UCLA (Round of 64)
  Guillermo Nuñez, TCU (Round of 32)
  Sebastian Stiefelmeyer, Louisville (Round of 16)
  Søren Hess-Olesen, Texas (Round of 32)
  Noah Rubin, Wake Forest (Championship)
  Ryan Shane, Virginia (National Champion)

Players ranked 9th–16th, listed by last name
 Nicolas Alvarez, Duke (Round of 32)
 Gonzales Austin, Vanderbilt (Round of 64)
 Romain Bogaerts, Wake Forest (Round of 32)
 Yannick Hanfmann, USC (Round of 16)
 Dominik Köpfer, Tulane (Round of 32)
 Mikelis Libietis, Tennessee (Round of 16)
 Quentin Monaghan, Notre Dame (semifinals)
 Brayden Schnur, North Carolina (Round of 64)

Finals bracket
For full bracket:

Women's singles championship
Note: Matches from all six rounds were played in Waco, Texas from May 20–25, 2015.

National seeds

  Robin Anderson, UCLA (quarterfinals)
  Carol Zhao, Stanford (Championship)
  Brooke Austin, Florida (Round of 64)
  Maegan Manasse, California (Round of 16)
  Lauren Herring, Georgia (Round of 64)
  Julie Elbaba, Virginia (Round of 32)
  Jamie Loeb, North Carolina (National Champion)
  Sydney Campbell, Vanderbilt (Round of 32)

Players ranked 9th–16th, listed by last name
 Hayley Carter, North Carolina (Round of 64)
 Danielle Collins, Virginia  (quarterfinals)
  Joana Eidukonyte, Clemson (Round of 16)
  Lorraine Guillermo, Pepperdine (Round of 64)
  Julia Jones, Ole Miss (Round of 32)
 Josie Kuhlman, Florida (semifinals)
 Giuliana Olmos, USC (Round of 32)
 Stephanie Wagner, Miami (FL) (semifinals)

Finals bracket
For full bracket:

Men's doubles championship
Note: All matches, including those from the First Round and the Round of 16, were played in Waco, Texas from May 20–25, 2015.

National seeds

  Ben Wagland /  Austin Smith, Georgia (quarterfinals)
  Roberto Quiroz /  Yannick Hanfmann, USC (Round of 32)
  Luca Corinteli /  Ryan Shane, Virginia (Round of 32)
  Mikelis Libietis /  Hunter Reese, Tennessee (quarterfinals)

Players ranked 5th–8th in no particular order
 Julian Lenz /  Diego Galeano, Baylor (semifinals)
 Julian Cash /  Florian Lakat, Mississippi State (Round of 32)
 Kevin Metka /  Ralf Steinbach, Ohio State (Round of 32)
 Gonzales Austin /  Rhys Johnson, Vanderbilt (Round of 32)

Finals bracket
For full bracket:

Women's doubles championship
Note: All matches, including those from the First Round and the Round of 16, were played in Waco, Texas from May 20–25, 2015.

National seeds

  Erin Routliffe /  Maya Jansen, Alabama (National Champions)
  Carol Zhao /  Taylor Davidson, Stanford (quarterfinals)
  Catherine Harrison /  Kyle McPhillips, UCLA (Round of 32)
  Beatrice Gumulya /  Jessy Rompies, Clemson (quarterfinals)

Players ranked 5th–8th in no particular order
 Emily Flickinger /  Pleun Burgmans, Auburn (Round of 32)
 Maegan Manasse /  Denise Starr, California (Round of 16)
 Zsofi Susanyi /  Klara Fabikova, California (Championship)
 Brooke Austin /  Kourtney Keegan, Florida (semifinals)

Finals bracket
For full bracket:

References

NCAA Division I tennis championships
NCAA
Sports in Waco, Texas